King George's Fields
King G
Lists of buildings and structures in Merseyside